College Hill is an unincorporated community in Bowie County, in the U.S. state of Texas. According to the Handbook of Texas, the community had a population of 116 in 1990. It is located within the Texarkana metropolitan area.

History
W.H. Patty operated a sawmill and gin in the area in the early 1890s. It is here that College Hill was established. A post office was established at College Hill in 1902 and remained in operation until 1907. Its population was 100 in 1915, which went down to 30 in 1945, and had a store in operation. There was a church, a cemetery, a business, and several scattered houses in 1984. The population was 116 in 1990, but there was no population recorded in 2000.

Geography

Education
College Hill is served by the Simms Independent School District. It joined the school district with 8 other nearby communities in 1938.

References

Unincorporated communities in Bowie County, Texas
Unincorporated communities in Texas